Joël Vermin (born 5 February 1992) is a Swiss professional ice hockey winger who is currently playing for SC Bern of the National League (NL). Vermin was selected by the Tampa Bay Lightning in the 7th round (186th overall) of the 2013 NHL Entry Draft.

Playing career

Juniors

Vermin made his National League A debut in Switzerland with SC Bern during the 2009–10 season. On 17 September 2013, Vermin was signed to a three-year, entry-level contract with the Tampa Bay Lightning.

In his first season of professional hockey, Vermin was loaned to SC Bern for the season. In 55 games that season, Vermin recorded 22 points. In his career with Bern, he played in 230 games, registering 41 goals and 64 assists. At the finish of the season, Vermin joined the Syracuse Crunch for the remainder of the AHL season.

Professional

On 18 November 2015, the Tampa Bay Lightning recalled Vermin from the Syracuse Crunch. Vermin had skated in 12 games with the Crunch that season, posting three goals and ten points. At the time, he was ranked first in both assists (seven) and points. In his career, he has appeared in 93 career AHL games, all with the Syracuse Crunch during the past three seasons. During that time, he recorded 16 goals and 44 points. In 2016, Vermin posted career bests in games played (73), goals (12), assists (21) and points (33). On 19 November 2015, Vermin made his NHL debut in a 2-1 Lightning win over the visiting New York Rangers. On 21 November 2015, Vermin recorded his first NHL point in a 5-0 Lightning win over the Anaheim Ducks. Vermin assisted on a Nikita Kucherov goal in his second NHL game.

On 21 May 2016, the Lightning re-signed Vermin to a one-year, two-way contract. Vermin skated in six games with the Lightning during the 2015-16 regular season, recording one assist and a plus-1 rating. Vermin has also played in 118 career AHL games over three seasons, all with Syracuse, recording 22 goals and 55 points.

On 20 June 2017, Lausanne HC announced that it had signed Vermin to a five-year contract with an NHL out clause for a one-way deal. The deal was previously reported in January.

During the summer of 2020, Vermin caused a major dispute within Lausanne's locker room after reportedly sleeping with a teammate's wife. The team immediately told the media that he would no longer suit up for them and that he would either be traded or sent to the press box. On 18 August 2020, Vermin failed to report to training camp, which began that same day, despite being summoned.

On 14 September 2020, Vermin was eventually traded to Genève-Servette HC in exchange for Petr Cajka and Tim Bozon.

On 5 August 2021, Vermin agreed to a four-year deal to return to original club, SC Bern, starting in the 2022–23 season and through to the 2025–26 season.

Personal
His father is from the Netherlands while his mother is from Hungary. Though Vermin had the option to play hockey internationally for Switzerland, Hungary or the Netherlands, he chose Switzerland because he was born in the country and developed there.

Career statistics

Regular season and playoffs

International

References

External links

1992 births
Living people
SC Bern players
Genève-Servette HC players
Lausanne HC players
People from Bern-Mittelland District
Swiss expatriate sportspeople in the United States
Swiss ice hockey forwards
Swiss people of Dutch descent
Swiss people of Hungarian descent
Syracuse Crunch players
Tampa Bay Lightning draft picks
Tampa Bay Lightning players
Ice hockey players at the 2022 Winter Olympics
Olympic ice hockey players of Switzerland
Sportspeople from the canton of Bern